Compsolechia religata is a moth of the family Gelechiidae. It was described by Edward Meyrick in 1922. It is found in Peru.

The wingspan is about 10 mm. The forewings are dark grey, becoming blackish grey posteriorly. There is an obscure grey-whitish shade from the costa at four-fifths to the tornus, obtusely indented above the middle. The hindwings are dark fuscous.

References

Moths described in 1922
Compsolechia
Taxa named by Edward Meyrick